Kansas's 31st Senate district is one of 40 districts in the Kansas Senate. It has been represented by Republican Carolyn McGinn since 2005.

Geography
District 31 covers parts of Sedgwick County and all of Harvey County in the northern suburbs of Wichita, including some of northern Wichita proper as well as Newton, Park City, Valley Center, Hesston, Halstead, North Newton, Sedgwick, Kechi, Bel Aire, and Maize.

The district is located entirely within Kansas's 4th congressional district, and overlaps with the 72nd, 74th, 89th, 90th, 91st, 100th, and 103rd districts of the Kansas House of Representatives.

Recent election results

2020

2016

2012

Federal and statewide results in District 31

References

31
Harvey County, Kansas
Sedgwick County, Kansas